This is a list of the 1970 PGA Tour Qualifying School graduates.

The tournament was held in early November at Tucson Country Club in Tucson, Arizona for the first time. There were nine 54-hole district tournaments to determine the final field of 60 players for the final 72-hole qualifying tournament. 18 players earned their tour cards with Bob Barbarossa being medalist. There was a five-for-one playoff for the last card.

Tournament summary 
This was the first year that Greg Powers attempted to qualify for the PGA Tour at PGA Tour Qualifying Tournament. He was not successful. Australian player David Graham also attempted to qualify. However, he was not successful either.

List of graduates 

Sources:

References

PGA Tour Qualifying School
Golf in Arizona
PGA Tour Qualifying School Graduates
PGA Tour Qualifying School Graduates